The 1806 United States Senate election in Pennsylvania was held from December 9 to 16, 1806. Andrew Gregg was elected by the Pennsylvania General Assembly to the United States Senate.

Results
Incumbent Democratic-Republican George Logan, who was elected in a special election in 1801, was not a candidate for re-election to another term. The Pennsylvania General Assembly, consisting of the House of Representatives and the Senate, convened on December 9, 1806, to elect a new Senator to fill the term beginning on March 4, 1807. Four ballots were recorded over the next week. The results of the fourth and final ballot of both houses combined are as follows:

|-
|-bgcolor="#EEEEEE"
| colspan="3" align="right" | Totals
| align="right" | 112
| align="right" | 100.00%
|}

See also 
 United States Senate elections, 1806 and 1807

References

External links
Pennsylvania Election Statistics: 1682-2006 from the Wilkes University Election Statistics Project

1806 
Pennsylvania
United States Senate